Greystones is a town in Wicklow, Ireland

Greystones, or Graystones may also refer to:

 Graystones, a mountain in Cumbria, England, United Kingdom
 Greystones, South Yorkshire, a suburb of Sheffield
 Graystones Forest, the location where William Penn met with members of the Lenape Indian tribe in 1682 to negotiate the first land-purchase survey in Pennsylvania.

See also

Greystone (disambiguation)